Cape Raoul is a rural locality and a natural feature in the local government area of Tasman in the South-east region of Tasmania. The 2016 census determined a population of nil for the state suburb of Cape Raoul.

Cape Raoul is a confirmed suburb/locality.

Boundaries and location
The shore of the Tasman Sea is the locality's western, southern, and eastern boundaries. The cape is contained within the locality, which is contained within the western section of Tasman National Park.

Cape Raoul (the natural feature) is situated at the southernmost part of the Tasman Peninsula, in south eastern Tasmania. It forms the coastline of Raoul Bay, and is part of the dolerite landscape of the Tasman National Park.

Geography
The cape features rock platforms, towering cliffs, columns and off-shore islands. There is a  cliff with scenic views of the coastline. A  walking track there then descends steadily onto the Cape Raoul plateau, with the spectacular cape of dolerite columns at the end of the plateau.

The cape is accessed via Port Arthur at the end of Stormlea Road.

Columns

The columns at the cape appear to be a colonnade formed from columnar jointing. This happens when a pool of magma cools at just the right rate so that as its surface contracts, it cracks into polygonal plates. The cracks accelerate the cooling, extending the cracks vertically, thereby forming columns.

History
A note from 1911 made a description of the cape:
	
So named from D'Entrecasteaux's pilot. Flinders called it Basaltic Cape, but only prior to the publication of the maps of the French expedition. "In 1814 Flinders very honestly (writes Comte deFleurieu) replaces on his map the name of Raoull, stating that he gave up the name of Basaltic. This notwithstanding, Scott, Cross, and Arrowsmith chart it as Raoull or Basaltic.

Gallery

References

Tasman National Park
Raoul
Tasman Peninsula
Localities of Tasman Council
Towns in Tasmania